Diamond Hill is an MTR station located in Tai Hom, Northern Kowloon. The station is incorporated into the large Plaza Hollywood development.

Station layout 

Platforms 1 and 2 share an island platform, and platforms 3 and 4 share another. Space was reserved for the platforms of the East Kowloon line when this station was built in the 1970s. This can be seen behind the advertising panels on the Kwun Tong line platforms. The spaces for the reserved platforms are little more than untrimmed rock formations behind the advertising panels.

The Tuen Ma line platforms are located to the south of those of the Kwun Tong line; the station was expanded to include those platforms and an extended concourse as part of the Sha Tin to Central Link project.

Livery
This station's livery is greyish black with silver stones symbolising diamonds.

History 
Diamond Hill station was opened as part of the original Modified Initial System on 1 October 1979. The Tuen Ma line platforms were opened on 14 February 2020.

Entrances/exits 

A1: Lung Poon Court,Fung Tak Estate
A2: San Po Kong 
B: Rhythm Garden 
C1: Tai Hom Road
C2: Plaza Hollywood

Gallery 

The photos were taken while the station was still part of the Tuen Ma Line Phase 1.

References 

MTR stations in Kowloon
Kwun Tong line
Sha Tin to Central Link
Tuen Ma line
Railway stations in Hong Kong opened in 1979
Tai Hom
1979 establishments in Hong Kong